Çamlarca can refer to:

 Çamlarca, Kale
 Çamlarca, Kozan